Outlive is a real-time strategy video game developed and produced by Brazilian studio Continuum Entertainment. It is a mission-based real-time strategy game where the player controls either the human military or robot forces and attempts to eliminate all opposing forces. It was initially released in 2000 in Brazil (2001 for the rest of the world), and was the second and most successful product of Continuum. The game was one of the few Brazilian games to be published by a mainstream AAA publisher. It was published in the United States and Europe by Take-Two Interactive.

Plot summary

Human Campaign
The increase of terrorist activity around the globe (the terrorist organizations had merged, creating large conglomerates whom the strongest and most feared was the Liberty Army) and the rapidly dwindling natural resources of the planet had forced the world's most powerful nations to take decisive measures. April 17, 2035 saw the creation of the World Council. The Council saw humanity's survival in interplanetary supply of resources mined on other celestial bodies. They sent out a large group of probes to nearly every planet and moon of the Solar System. After a lengthy search, they had found that the richest object is Titan. The Council started the Outlive Project: constructing three starships which would carry the initial colonists there. However, there was a problem: Titan's atmosphere was toxic to humans, and the climate was not so friendly either.

Two groups had arisen to solve the problem. One of them, led by Dr. Joseph Taylor, had tried to create genetically modified creatures to do the initial work. The other group, led by Dr. Mary-Anne Harley and sponsored by Mechatronics Inc., would combine robotics with sophisticated AI, making them suitable to do anything without the need for human supervision. Due to the shortage of time, the World Council gave both teams one Earth year to create working prototypes of the respective projects.

As the Outlive project neared completion, Dr. Taylor was ordered to relocate to a new research base after an unsuccessful attempt on his life. Prior to the transfer, all staff and equipment was stored in a military outpost. As LA forces held the sector, the newly created Special Counter-Terrorist Group and its leader, Brad Maxwell, had to clear a safe way for the convoy to the lab. Maxwell was a little angry at Taylor, as the impatient scientist had gone to the lab already when he reached the outpost. However, shortly after their arrival, a breakout of the unstable beings known as Abominables occurred. They had destroyed the base, scattering the staff. Taylor had been found and evacuated. Because of the accident, the World Council had terminated Taylor's contract, much to his protest, declaring that the three Outlive ships will have a robotic crew. However, the Liberty Army had occupied Mechatronics.

Maxwell had cleared them out, using some of the Mechatronics' head, Carl Eberhardt's prototype battle robots. Even though the LA has been pushed out, Maxwell became suspicious of Mechatronics' motives, as materials used for weapons had been found in the facility. One of his subordinates, Lieutenant Peter Mackenzie, accompanied him to the Experimental City, where they believed Mechatronics trained their robots as soldiers. Although General Kaminski told them to don't care with this subject, they found hard proof in the Technology Center. Kaminski promised them a complete investigation after the Outlive mission was away.

The three ships were finally completed, but the launch was halted by news of two AA-artilleries recently installed by Pablo Morales, leader of the Liberty Army, very close to the launching sites. As both of them had been destroyed by Maxwell, the mission was finally launched. However, there were a third artillery, hidden in an underground base. SCTG forces quickly destroyed it, but the damage has been done: the rocket hit Outlive-1. Upon reentry, the ship broke into 3 larger pieces. Outlive-2 had reported of a contact with something then connection was lost. Outlive-3 reported they had safely landed on Titan and started mining operations as per orders.

The World Council received reports that Liberty Army forces were on their way to the crash site. As Maxwell and Mackenzie arrived in the sector, Kaminski told them that he was allied with Mechatronics, and ordered all of their units to execute them. But he had been interrupted by Mackenzie who told Maxwell that he is an operative to the Liberty Army; Morales had known of the World Council's corruption and their affiliation with Mechatronics; that was the reason why he attacked the corporation's facility and tried to prevent the launch. Infuriated, Maxwell willingly joined the Army to make Kaminski pay for his betrayal. Both were rescued by Morales, who told them that the robots from the downed ship had started to establish a base and mine, as if they were really on Titan. To prevent the council from utilizing them, the three destroyed the camp and their commander, Procyon.

Utilizing information acquired by an agent, they have discovered that the council had built ICBMs, missiles packed with nuclear warheads of a large yield. They plan to use it against the Liberty Army's encampments around the world. Mackenzie successfully disarmed all silos, however the last were booby-trapped: when Mackenzie went inside to work on that, the multi-megaton warhead exploded.
After a long-lasting and bloody battle, the Liberty Army bested both the most elite forces of the World Council and the well-armed support troops of the Mechatronics. The council had collapsed, and the Army had formed the Confederation.

Robot Campaign
When the Outlive-2 got out of contact, they had been secretly recalled to Earth to help the World Council against the Liberty Army. However, the war was already over when they had landed. Commander of the ship, Argus, had set "his" first objective of contacting Eberhardt. When "he" reached the base, it was in bad condition because of a surprise attack. Eberhardt fled, but was found. After destroying the nearby Confederate outpost, Eberhardt revealed his plans to Argus: "he" would have to construct and protect a portal to Titan, from which additional help in the form of Draco, leader of Outlive-3 and his minions will emerge. With this newfound help, they had recaptured Mechatronics.

Some time after this, Eberhardt has been contacted by Kaminski. The Russian offered info for a meeting. As Eberhardt did not trust him, Argus was sent. His instincts were right, as it was a trap. Kaminski said that Maxwell had granted him protection if he manages to capture a commander. Draco was enraged, and leveled the base, but Argus was already shipped to another. "He" was rescued this time, with Kaminski personally killed by Draco.

Draco received intelligence of a secret base in a valley, where Dr. Harley is experimenting with robots. When the base was destroyed, the two commanders went through the valley in search for more enemies. They had been surprised by a large number of troops and Dr. Harley, who congratulated Argus for a good job. It turns out that she altered Argus' programming so that he would obey and sell Draco out. The latter obviously did not want to go through this and had gone berserk. However, the troops gained the upper hand and left him for dead. "He" was rescued by Eberhardt.

The two had learned about Harley's experiments and that she needed a cache of microprocessors to power up her own robots. They had prevented the cargo from reaching the destination, and even destroyed the Confederate forces in a large-scale attack.

Cooperation campaign
Mechatronics had taken control of the planet and the last remnants of the Confederacy is being hunted by robotic execution squads. Maxwell has been captured, Morales and Argus are on the run. The remaining forces of the Liberty Army and the Robots loyal to the Confederacy had formed the Resistance. Argus and Pablo had formed a base of both humans and Robots which had been attacked by two different Robotic bases, from both the North (Blue base) & from the South (Cyan base). Then the Campaign has a twist, if you destroy the Blue base, Argus and Pablo go to rescue Maxwell which is protected by a Robotic Stronghold and a strong Robotic army which was led by a Robotic Commander named Sentinel. But if you destroy the Cyan base, Argus & Pablo alone go to save Dr. Marry Anne Harley which was attacked by Robots.
When Argus & Pablo go to save Maxwell, they first have to destroy Sentinel for he was the only Al in the army & if he was destroyed, the Robotic Army would shut down. When Sentinel was destroyed, Argus & Pablo had destroyed the Robotic Stronghold & rescued Maxwell. The Resistance had also taken the remaining Robots and reprogrammed them to serve the Resistance.
When Argus & Pablo alone went to rescue Dr. Mary Anne Harley, they had to destroy the AA-Artillery, which wasn't easy for they had to sneak pass the Robots which were well armed and had set up a large base. When Argus & Pablo destroyed the AA-Artillery, the Resistance Air-Force could come and destroy the Robots, thus rescuing Dr. Mary Anne.
After these 2 missions, Argus and Pablo gather the Men and Robots of the Resistance and destroy the Mechatronics base in a large scale battle. The Resistance won, thus bringing the end to the harsh rule of Mechatronics. Carl had escaped, but the New Confederation had been formed, with Brad Maxwell as its leader, and an era of peace had begun.
Little did they know, that Carl had escaped from Earth and hidden himself in a space station, somewhere not far from Earth. It was at that moment that it was discovered that Carl Eberheart was working for an alien race that wishes to bring Earth to ruin. Carl was executed by the Alien Leader for his failure. Then a massive fleet of Alien UFOs appear, heading towards Earth.

Reception

The game received "mixed" reviews according to the review aggregation website Metacritic.

References

External links
 Continuum official website
 

Real-time strategy video games
Science fiction video games
Multiplayer online games
Multiplayer video games
2000 video games
Video games developed in Brazil
Windows games
Windows-only games